Abdelhamid Sharaf (8 July 1939 – 3 July 1980), was a Jordanian politician born in Iraq who served as the 24th Prime Minister of Jordan from December 1979 until his death of a heart attack after seven months in office.  King Hussein announced the death in a live radio broadcast and said that "His death could not have come at a worse time."  Sharaf was  ambassador to the United States (1967–1972), Canada (1969–1972) and the United Nations (1972–1976).

See also 
 List of prime ministers of Jordan

References

External links
 Biographies on Rulers.org
 Prime Ministry of Jordan website

Prime Ministers of Jordan
1939 births
1980 deaths
People from Baghdad
American University of Beirut alumni
Ambassadors of Jordan to the United States
Ambassadors of Jordan to Canada
Permanent Representatives of Jordan to the United Nations